Paul Currie (born 2 March 1968) is the Australian co-founder and director of Lightstream Pictures. His directorial work spans feature films and the staging of live events.

Currie directed and produced the 2004 feature film One Perfect Day, for which he was awarded Best Debut Director from the Screen Director's Association of Australia. He also produced the 1995 Australian action feature film Under the Gun, and in 1997 co-authored the best selling book, Heroes: A Guide to Realising Your Dreams (forwarded by Bryce Courtenay – author of The Power of One). Currie directed the acclaimed 2000 documentary Lionheart - The Jesse Martin Story and also served as creative director for World Reconciliation Day, a live and filmed event that featured Nelson Mandela and Rubin 'Hurricane' Carter.

In 2005, Currie was nominated as Australian of the Year for co-founding a charity organization called The Reach Foundation.
As the founder of the Elliot Currie Drama Studios in Melbourne.

Filmography
 One Perfect Day (2004) – Director, producer, writer
 Hacksaw Ridge (2016) – Producer
 2:22 (2017) – Director, producer
 Bleeding Steel (2017) – Producer
 The King's Daughter (2022) – Producer

References

External links 
 Lightstream Pictures
 The Reach Foundation

1968 births
Australian film directors
Australian film producers
Living people